Celebración de la Ciudad Natal is a live album by the indie rock band My Morning Jacket, released exclusively for Record Store Day and sold only in exclusive independent retail stores. The audio was taken from two concerts held in Louisville, Kentucky at record store ear X-tacy and at Waterfront Park. On May 1 the band re-released the album digitally, also sold exclusively on an independent music site and available for streaming on Spotify.

Track listing
"Evil Urges"
"Highly Suspicious"
Interlude: 'The Local Independent Shit'
"Gideon"
"Where to Begin"
"Librarian"
"Phone Went West"
"Dondante"

Notes
Tracks 1, 2 and 6 taken from Evil Urges.
Tracks 4, 8 taken from Z.
Track 7 taken from At Dawn.
Track 3 is an audio interlude with the audience.
Track 5 appears in the soundtrack to the film Elizabethtown.

References

External links
 

My Morning Jacket live albums
2009 live albums
ATO Records live albums
Record Store Day releases